The 2017 Football Federation Victoria season was the fourth season under the new competition format for state-level football (soccer) in Victoria.  The competition consists of seven divisions across the state of Victoria.

League Tables

2017 National Premier Leagues Victoria

The 2017 National Premier Leagues Victoria season was played over 26 rounds. The overall premier of this division qualified for the 2017 National Premier Leagues finals series, competing with the other state federation champions in a final knockout tournament to decide the National Premier Leagues champion for 2017.

Finals

Promotion/relegation play-off

2017 National Premier Leagues Victoria 2

West

The 2017 National Premier Leagues Victoria 2 West was played over 28 rounds, with each team playing the teams in their conference twice and the other conference once. The top team at the end of the season was promoted to National Premier Leagues Victoria, while the second placed team entered the promotion play-off.

East

The 2017 National Premier Leagues Victoria 2 East was played over 28 rounds, with each team playing the teams in their conference twice and the other conference once. The top team at the end of the season was promoted to National Premier Leagues Victoria, while the second placed team entered the promotion play-off.

Grand Final

The NPL2 Season concluded with a single match between the winners of the leagues in the West and East sections, to determine the NPL2 Champion.

2017 Victoria State League 1

North-West

South-East

2017 Victoria State League 2

North-West

South-East

2017 Victoria State League 3

North-West

South-East

2017 Victoria State League 4

North

West

South

East

2017 Victoria State League 5

North

West

South

East

2017 Women's National Premier League 

The highest tier domestic football competition in Victoria for women is known for sponsorship reasons as the PS4 Women's National Premier League.   This was the second season of the NPL Women's format. The 10 teams (including newly promoted South Melbourne), played each other 3 times for a total of 27 games.

Finals

2017 Victorian Regional Leagues
(For a full list of season honours, see individual Leagues)

Cup Competitions

2017 Dockerty Cup

Football Victoria soccer clubs competed in 2017 for the Dockerty Cup. The tournament doubled as the Victorian qualifiers for the 2017 FFA Cup, with the top four clubs progressing to the Round of 32. A total of 217 clubs entered the qualifying phase, with the clubs entering in a staggered format.

The Cup was won by Heidelberg United.

In addition to the two A-League clubs (Melbourne Victory and Melbourne City), the four semi-finalists (Bentleigh Greens, Heidelberg United, Hume City and South Melbourne) competed in the final rounds of the 2017 FFA Cup.

References

Football Federation Victoria
Soccer in Victoria (Australia)